CFAE may refer to:

 complex fractionated atrial electrogram, a recording of the electrical signals of certain abnormal heart conditions
 Council for Art Education, Inc.